Spiro Kourkoumelis (born 31 July 1963) is a former Australian rules footballer who played with Carlton and St Kilda in the Victorian Football League (VFL). After leaving St Kilda, he played for Coburg in the Victorian Football Association (VFA). He attended Princes Hill Secondary College in Carlton North. He is currently proprietor of Avanti Cycles on Sydney Road, Brunswick.

Notes

External links 

Spiro Kourkoumelis's profile at Blueseum

1963 births
Carlton Football Club players
St Kilda Football Club players
Living people
Australian people of Greek descent
Australian rules footballers from Victoria (Australia)
Coburg Football Club players